Tefft is an unincorporated community in Kankakee Township, Jasper County, Indiana, United States.

History
Tefft was platted by Isaac Dunn in 1884, and named Dunnville. The name, however, became confused with Danville so Dunnville was renamed Tefft after Dunn's brother-in-law, Dr. Benjamin Franklin Tefft.

A post office was established at Tefft in 1883, and remained in operation until it was discontinued in 2003.

References

Unincorporated communities in Jasper County, Indiana
Unincorporated communities in Indiana